The 1921 Wiley Wildcats football team was an American football team that represented Wiley College during the 1921 college football season. The Wiley team met Talladega in a post-season game on December 9 to determine the black college football national championship; the game ended in a 7–7 tie and both teams are recognized as co-champions.  The Wiley team played its home games at the 1,000-seat Wiley Athletic Park in Marshall, Texas.

Schedule

References

Wiley
Wiley Wildcats football seasons
Black college football national champions
Southwestern Athletic Conference football champion seasons
Wiley Wildcats football
College football undefeated seasons